Elsa Vazzoler (10 May 1920 – 8 August 1989) was an Italian stage, film, television and voice actress.

Life and career 
Born in Treviso, Vazzoler started studying acting and ballet after finishing high school. She debuted with dialect amateur dramatics, and in 1945 entered the stage company led by Memo Benassi. Vazzoler got her first leading role in 1949 under the stage direction of Anton Giulio Bragaglia, and later was first actress in the Cesco Baseggio company for several years. She was specialized in the Carlo Goldoni repertoire.

Vazzoler was also active in cinema, in which she was mainly chosen to play character roles in comedies, in radio and on television, which gave her the greatest popularity with the general public thanks to the participation to some successful TV-series.

Filmography 

 Il richiamo nella tempesta, directed by Oreste Palella (1952)
 Nero and the Burning of Rome, directed by Primo Zeglio (1953)
 Golden Vein, directed by Mauro Bolognini (1955)
 The Miller's Beautiful Wife, directed by Mario Camerini (1955)
 I quattro del getto tonante, directed by Fernando Cerchio (1955)
 The Great War, directed by Mario Monicelli (1959)
 Appuntamento a Ischia, directed by Mario Mattoli (1960)
 Lettere di una novizia, directed by Alberto Lattuada (1960)
 The Fascist, directed by Luciano Salce (1961)
 5 marines per 100 ragazze, directed by Mario Mattoli (1961)
 Un angelo per Ribot, directed by Carlo Capriata (1963)
 I terribili 7, directed by Raffaello Matarazzo (1963)
 Corpse for the Lady, directed by Mario Mattoli (1964)
 Romeo and Juliet, directed by Riccardo Freda (1964)
 I Kill, You Kill, directed by Gianni Puccini (1965)
 Riderà (Cuore matto), directed by Bruno Corbucci (1967)
 The Long, the Short, the Cat, directed by Lucio Fulci (1967)
 Cuore matto... matto da legare, directed by Mario Amendola (1967)
 The Head of the Family, directed by Nanni Loy (1967)
 Police Chief Pepe, directed by Ettore Scola (1969)
 Quelli belli... siamo noi, directed by Giorgio Mariuzzo (1970)
 Il merlo maschio, directed by Pasquale Festa Campanile (1971)
 Gli ordini sono ordini, directed by Franco Giraldi (1972)
 Il bacio di una morta, directed by Carlo Infascelli (1974)
 La presidentessa, directed by Luciano Salce (1977)
 Wifemistress, directed by Marco Vicario (1977)
 How to Lose a Wife and Find a Lover, directed by Pasquale Festa Campanile (1978)
 Il corpo della ragassa, directed by Pasquale Festa Campanile (1979)
 Chaste and Pure, directed by Salvatore Samperi (1981)
 Attila flagello di Dio, directed by Castellano e Pipolo (1982)
 I'm Going to Live by Myself, directed by Marco Risi (1982)
 Troppo forte, directed by Carlo Verdone (1986)
 Un uomo di razza, directed by Bruno Rasia (1988)

References

External links  

 

1920 births  
1989 deaths  
People from Treviso
Italian film actresses 
Italian stage actresses 
Italian television actresses
Italian voice actresses